J. R. "Bob" Dobbs is the  figurehead of the parody religion
the Church of the SubGenius. His image is derived from a collection of clip art distributed by the Bell Telephone Company of West Texas in 1946. 

According to SubGenius dogma, "Bob" was a drilling equipment salesman who, in 1953, saw a vision of the god JHVH-1 on a television set he had built. The vision inspired him to write the "PreScriptures" (as described in the Book of the SubGenius) and found the Church. The theology holds that "Bob" is the greatest salesman who ever lived, and has cheated death a number of times. He is also revered for his great follies and believed to be a savior of "Slack". He was assassinated in San Francisco in 1984, though the Church claims that he has come back from the dead several times since then.

The quotation marks in "Bob"'s name are always included when spelling his name, according to the Church.

Personal history
According to Revelation X; The "Bob" Apocryphon, "Bob" was born in Dallas, Texas, to Xinucha-Chi-Xan M. Dobbs (a pharmacist) and Jane McBride Dobbs. At an early age, he possessed a talent for making large amounts of money by playing the stock market over the telephone. He married his wife Connie in Las Vegas in 1955 and worked as a photographer's model while inventing and patenting novelty gag items. In 1957, he worked weekends doing Evangelical Christian preaching "strictly for the money".

Robert Anton Wilson's short story "The Horror on Howth Hill" involves a conversation between Dobbs and the mad scientist De Selby.

Connie Dobbs

Constance "Connie" Marsh Dobbs, the wife of "Bob", has become nearly as legendary in SubGenius circles as "Bob".  Although "Bob" has been married to other women, spirits, deities, and inanimate objects, Connie is described in the SubGenius documentary Arise! as "his first, and still his primary wife." Connie, an actress and model who formed the Home for Slackless Children, is the patron of SubGenius women, and she is seen as a vision of true liberation for women.  She refuses to submit to anyone (especially "Bob"), and she is just as free-wheeling and promiscuous as her husband, although she has a more level head on her shoulders when it comes to domestic issues.

Dobbstown
According to Church lore, "Bob" travelled to Sarawak, Malaysia, and founded his headquarters, a secret enclave there, called Dobbstown, where he often stays.

Images of "Bob"

"Bobs image first appeared in the original SubGenius publication, SubGenius Pamphlet #1 (a.k.a. "The World Ends Tomorrow and You May Die") (1979). Since his initial appearance, his face has appeared in numerous places around the world, and it has made cameo appearances on everything from graffiti art on highway overpasses and as part of the graphical character set of the Atari ST operating system, to musical albums by many underground bands (and several popular mainstream rock bands, ranging from Devo to Sublime) and the occasional film (The Wizard of Speed and Time), TV show (Pee-wee's Playhouse) and cartoon (SpongeBob SquarePants). There are also two German comics with "Bob" ("Future Subjunkies" and "Space Bastards", both by Gerhard Seyfried and Ziska Riemann). The Church of the SubGenius maintains the trademark and copyright on "Bobs image, though it has tried to avoid taking legal action unless absolutely necessary. "Bobs image is commonly seen on the Usenet newsgroup alt.binaries.slack, where he appears regularly in images by many artists. Proper etiquette on the newsgroup dictates that credit be given where it is due, and acknowledgement of the ownership of "Bobs image by the Church is accepted by the regular newsgroup participants.

J.R. "Bob" Dobbs served as the inspiration for the character of Professor Utonium in the cartoon The Powerpuff Girls. The DC Comics character Doc Magnus also bears a strong visual resemblance to "Bob."

Sacred Ikon

Around 2002, the Church adopted a new symbol called the "Sacred Ikon", which is a stylized cross consisting of three bars and a pipe, placed in a pattern that matches the eyes, nose, mouth, and pipe of "Bobs image.

Time poll
In its January 1, 2000 issue, a Time Internet-based poll named J. R. "Bob" Dobbs the  "Phoney or Fraud" of the 20th century.

References

External links

Dobbs, J. R. "Bob"
Dobbs, J. R. "Bob"
Dobbs, J. R. "Bob"